The ancient Egyptian Obelisk hieroglyph, Gardiner sign listed no. O25 is a portrayal of the obelisk. The hieroglyph is commonly used on erected Egyptian obelisks, as there is often a discussion of the event of its erection: a historical event, as well as an accomplishment of the pharaoh, and the Egyptian Kingdom.

Usage
The obelisk hieroglyph in the Egyptian language is t(kh)n, and is the identical word with the same spelling (different determinatives), for 'to beat a drum', musician, etc. There are other meanings for 'tekhen', as well. The obelisk is a determinative in the Egyptian language, and the word t(kh)n has multiple spellings, since obelisk construction was done over various time periods. Some spellings are: X1*Aa1:N35-O25-.-X1*Aa1:N35-W24:Z7-O25-O39 The second spelling uses the shortened variety of the block-of-stone (hieroglyph), N39 as the 2nd determinative.

Gallery

See also

Gardiner's Sign List#O. Buildings, Parts of Buildings, etc.
List of Egyptian hieroglyphs

References

Budge, 1978, (1920).  An Egyptian Hieroglyphic Dictionary, E.A.Wallace Budge, (Dover Publications), c 1978, (c 1920), Dover edition, 1978. (In two volumes, 1314 pp, and cliv-(154) pp.) (softcover)

Egyptian hieroglyphs: buildings and parts-of-buildings-etc